The Rannasee (or Rannastausee) is an artificial freshwater lake in Austria and in Germany. The reservoir is located along the Ranna River (which forms this part of the border between the two countries) and is the largest lake in the Bavarian Forest

The Rannasee was created in 1983 by damming the southeast corner (at the cost of 6.4 million Deutschmarks) both as a tourist resort and to generate hydro-electric power. The village of Meierhof occupies the east shore north of the dam.

Notes

External links
Rannasee.de – official web site

Reservoirs in Austria
Lakes of Bavaria
Lakes of Upper Austria
Austria–Germany border
International lakes of Europe
Reservoirs in Bavaria